John D. Campbell (21 May 1878 – 23 July 1955) was a Scottish professional golfer. Campbell was born in Troon, Scotland and came to the United States in 1900. He became an assistant to brother Alec "Nipper" Campbell at The Country Club in Brookline, Massachusetts. Campbell placed sixth in the 1903 U.S. Open and won three Philadelphia Open Championships. He was a golf pro at Huntingdon Valley Country Club and Overbrook Golf Club then went to north New Jersey for three years. In 1912, he came back to Pennsylvania and finished his career at Old York Road Country Club.

Professional wins
this list may be incomplete
1903 Philadelphia Open Championship
1904 Philadelphia Open Championship
1908 Philadelphia Open Championship
1926 Philadelphia PGA Championship

References

Scottish male golfers
Golfers from Pennsylvania
1878 births
1955 deaths